Stéphane Capiaux (born 5 June 1969) is a former professional footballer. He played as a midfielder.

External links
 Stéphane Capiaux profile at chamoisfc79.fr
 

1969 births
Living people
French footballers
Association football midfielders
AS Nancy Lorraine players
Stade Lavallois players
Chamois Niortais F.C. players
Ligue 1 players
Ligue 2 players
US Changé players
Wasquehal Football players